The 1879 FA Cup final was contested by Old Etonians and Clapham Rovers at the Kennington Oval, London Borough of Lambeth, South London. Old Etonians won by 1–0, the only goal scored by Charles Clerke.

Summary
Although Clapham dominated the early stages of the final, with Norman Bailey having two attempts on target, Herbert Whitfeld continued to run at the Clapham defenders with little assistance from his colleagues. After a goalless first-half, the only goal of the game came after 59 minutes, when Charles Clerke scored from close range following a run from Harry Goodhart. The old Etonians thus claimed the cup for the first time in what was considered to be "the poorest FA Cup Final to date".

Match details

References

External links
 Line-ups
 Match report at www.fa-cupfinals.co.uk

1879
1878–79 in English football
1879 sports events in London
March 1879 sports events